The West Virginia Independent Infantry Battalion was an infantry battalion that served in the Union Army during the American Civil War.

Service
The West Virginia Independent Infantry Battalion was organized at Wheeling in western Virginia between October 1, 1862, and January 9, 1863, and remained in garrison in Wheeling during its entire service. Company "B" of the battalion was mustered out on April 23, 1864.  Company "A" of the battalion was mustered out on May 31, 1865.

Casualties

Commanders

References
The Civil War Archive

See also
West Virginia Units in the Civil War
West Virginia in the Civil War

Units and formations of the Union Army from West Virginia
1862 establishments in Virginia
Military units and formations established in 1862
Military units and formations disestablished in 1865